The War of Darkie Pilbeam was a three-part period drama set in the North of England during the World War II, which originally aired on British television in 1968. It was written by Coronation Street creator Tony Warren and produced by Richard Everitt for Granada Television. The programme was broadcast on Friday nights.

The title character, Darkie Pilbeam, (Trevor Bannister), a none too successful petty crook, managed to rise to the top of his profession by running a profitable black-market operation. Inevitably, Pilbeam's world crashed and burned, but it was fun while it lasted.

The series was shown in three 60 minute episodes on ITV (with commercial breaks), which were titled: 
Phase I – September 1939 (originally broadcast 12 July 1968)
Phase II – June 1942 (originally broadcast 19 July 1968)
Phase III – August 1945 (originally broadcast 26 July 1968)

Cast
 Trevor Bannister as Darkie Pilbeam
 Sheila Raynor as Vera Dobson
 Christine Hargreaves as Marie Pilbeam
 Rhoda Lewis as Laura Pilbeam
 Terry Gilligan as Colin Pilbeam
 George Waring as Tommy Dobson
 Gabrielle Daye as Nell Perrott
 Caroline Dowdeswell as Jeanette Perrott
 Maggie Don as Louise Perrott
 John Collin as Ted Pilbeam
 Alan Browning as Ned Boston
 Julie Goodyear as Waitress
 Roy Barraclough as Bent Harry
 Lynne Carol as Mrs Cloth
 John Barrett as Toddy Bartholomew
 David Jackson as Civilian Policeman
 Stephen Yardley as Wolfgang

External links
 The War of Darkie Pilbeam at the British Film Institute website
 

1968 television films
1968 films
British television films

References